A gold bar is a quantity of refined metallic gold in any shape.

Gold bar and Gold Bar may also refer to:

Gold Bar, Edmonton, a residential neighbourhood in the Canadian city
Gold Bar Park, a park near the community
Gold Bar, Washington, United States
Gold Bar, a biscuit produced by UK food company McVitie's

See also
Gold Bar Recruiter, a newly-commissioned second lieutenant in the United States Army and United States Air Force ordered to a specific active duty